The Pyeatte House is a historic house at 311 South Mt. Olive Street in Siloam Springs, Arkansas.  It is a two-story structure, built of masonry and wood framing, with an asymmetrical organization.  Its left side is dominated by a projecting gable section with a round-arch porte-cochere beneath a bank of windows, and with scalloped wooden shingles filling the gable end.  Built 1932–34, it is the community's finest example of Tudor Revival architecture executed in fieldstone.

The house was listed on the National Register of Historic Places in 1995.

See also
National Register of Historic Places listings in Benton County, Arkansas

References

Houses on the National Register of Historic Places in Arkansas
Tudor Revival architecture in Arkansas
Houses completed in 1932
Houses in Siloam Springs, Arkansas
National Register of Historic Places in Benton County, Arkansas